The 1908–09 Ole Miss Rebels men's basketball team represents the University of Mississippi during the 1908–09 Intercollegiate Athletic Association of the United States college basketball season.

Schedule

|-

References

Ole Miss Rebels men's basketball seasons
Ole Miss
Ole Miss Rebels men's basketball team
Ole Miss Rebels men's basketball team